The Greedy Triangulation is a method to compute a polygon triangulation or a Point set triangulation using a  greedy schema, which adds edges one by one to the solution in strict increasing order by length, with the condition that an edge cannot cut a previously inserted edge.

References

Triangulation (geometry)
Optimization algorithms and methods